Releath is a hamlet southwest of Burras in west Cornwall, England.

References

Hamlets in Cornwall